1-Fluoro-2,4-dinitrobenzene (commonly called Sanger's reagent, dinitrofluorobenzene, DNFB or FDNB) is a chemical that reacts with the N-terminal amino acid of polypeptides.  This can be helpful for sequencing proteins.

Preparation 
In 1936, Gottlieb presented a synthesis in which 1-chloro-2,4-dinitrobenzene reacted with potassium fluoride (KF) in nitrobenzene:

Uses 

In 1945, Frederick Sanger described its use for determining the N-terminal amino acid in polypeptide chains, in particular insulin.  Sanger's initial results suggested that insulin was a smaller molecule than previously estimated (molecular weight 12,000), and that it consisted of four chains (two ending in glycine and two ending in phenylalanine), with the chains cross-linked by disulfide bonds.  Sanger continued work on insulin, using dinitrofluorobenzene in combination with other techniques, eventually resulted in the complete sequence of insulin (consisting of only two chains, with a molecular weight of 6,000).

Following Sanger's initial report of the reagent, the dinitrofluorobenzene method was widely adopted for studying proteins, until it was superseded by other reagents for terminal analysis (e.g., dansyl chloride and later aminopeptidases and carboxypeptidases) and other general methods for sequence determination (e.g., Edman degradation).

Dinitrofluorobenzene reacts with the amine group in amino acids to produce dinitrophenyl-amino acids.  These DNP-amino acids are moderately stable under acid hydrolysis conditions that break peptide bonds.  The DNP-amino acids can then be recovered, and the identity of those amino acids can be discovered through chromatography.  More recently, Sanger's reagent has also been used for the rather difficult analysis of distinguishing between the reduced and oxidized forms of glutathione and cysteine in biological systems in conjunction with HPLC.  This method is robust enough that it can be performed in such complex matrices as blood or cell lysate.

See also
N-Terminal amino acid analysis

References

Literature

External links 
 Fluorodinitrobenzene – 1-fluoro-2,4-dinitro-benzene (wikigenes.org)

Nitrobenzenes
Fluoroarenes